Orange Moldova is a subsidiary of Orange S.A. operating in Moldova since April 1998. The company is also an internet service provider and fixed voice services (point-to-point) provider for business.

At this time, Orange has GSM coverage of 99.4% of the population, and 98.9% of the country's territory, plus 88.5% of 3G services. Orange owns 65.4% of the telecommunications market and serves two million subscribers.

General information 
Communication standard: Orange works with GSM 900 and 1800 MHz and UMTS 2100 MHz, LTE 2600 MHz.

Numbering resources:

Orange network codes are: 068xxxxxx ; 069xxxxxx ; 060xxxxxx ; 0610xxxxx; 0611xxxxx; 0620xxxxx; 0621xxxxx.

The  international codes are: 

+37368xxxxxx ; +37369xxxxxx ; +37360xxxxxx ; +373610xxxxx...

Network code: 259 01, where 259 is the Mobile Country Code (MCC) for Moldova, and 01 is the Mobile Network Code (MNC) for Orange network.

Displayed on the phone screen: Orange, MD Orange, VOXTEL, TEMPO, or 259 01 depending on the phone.

History

Network start 
The joint-stock company was created in February 1998, under the name of Voxtel. The license was acquired for USD 8M. The company started its activity as a commercial entity on October 27, 1998. The former president made the first call of France Jacques Chirac in the presence of Moldova's former president Petru Lucinschi and mass-media representatives.

Rebranding 
On April 19, 2006, the company's shareholders decided that VOXTEL and Tempo become Orange. A year after the shareholders' decision (April 25, 2007), VOXTEL announced the launch of Orange, which opened new perspectives for Moldova's mobile market.

Competitors 
In 1998, Orange (which was still known as Voxtel) was the only mobile telephony services provider in the country. Given the licensing agreement with the government, the company was to have exclusive rights for 5 years. However, in 1999 the second GSM license was given to the company Moldcell and it began its activity in April 2000.

Due to the new competitor, Orange (still Voxtel at that point) launched the first pre-paid packages (Tempo) on the Moldovan market.

Starting March 1, 2007, a third mobile operator launched. The new operator, Unite, operates with the CDMA standard and is owned by the national telecommunications company Moldtelecom. The license was obtained without any competition in July 2006.

Services

Orange Abonament 
Subscribers can find a variety of offers for various communication needs. They can choose the option of calling, sending SMS and MMS messages and even surfing the Internet at the lowest possible price. After 6 months, all clients are included in Loyalty Program which offers a lot of benefits for all Orange Abonament customers. In 2010 Orange launched in Moldova successful commercial offers: Fluture, Delfin, and Pantera. The monthly fee is needed.

Orange PrePay 
Without a monthly fee.

Orange Business 
For corporate clients.

HD voice
Orange has won the Global Mobile Awards competition, which takes place at the most prestigious annual telecommunications event  Mobile World Congress. The Best Mobile Technology Breakthrough award was given for significant improvements in sound quality in mobile telephony, by implementing the world's first HD voice in Moldova. The company's progress in mobile technologies has been recognized worldwide, becoming the first mobile operator Orange in the country to win an international award of this size. HD voice was commercially launched in Moldova on September 9, 2009.

See also 
 Orange S.A.
 Orange Polska operating in Poland
 Orange Romania operating in Romania
 Orange Slovensko operating in Slovakia
 Orange España operating in Spain

References

External links 
 
 Official Orange online store
 Orange Voicemail Reviews

 Mobile phone companies of Moldova
 Orange S.A.